Bituing Walang Ningning (English: A Star Without Shine) is a 1985 Filipino drama musical film directed by Emmanuel Borlaza and starring Sharon Cuneta, Christopher de Leon, and Cherie Gil. The screenplay by Orlando Nadres is based on the komiks serial of the same name by Nerissa Cabral.

The film was digitally restored by Central Digital Lab, Inc.

Plot
Dorina Pineda (Sharon Cuneta), a sampaguita seller, is a devoted fan of singer Lavinia Arguelles (Cherie Gil), going to her concerts, even running on stage to give her flowers, and waiting outside her venues just to see and talk to her. Unbeknownst to her fans, Lavinia has an inflated ego and a cold and calculating personality that slowly drives away her boyfriend, Nico Escobar (Christopher de Leon). One day, Dorina's singing talents are discovered and soon her idol becomes her industry rival, with Nico supporting and falling for Dorina. After Lavinia calls Dorina "nothing but a second-rate, trying hard copycat" Dorina finally sees her idol for the flawed and bitter person she is. As her star rises, Dorina becomes doubtful over whether she is truly happy.

In the final scene, instead of going through with a concert showdown with Lavinia, Dorina announces that she is leaving show business and that this would be her last performance. While singing "Bituing Walang Ningning", Dorina calls Lavinia on stage and passes the microphone to her, then gives her flowers the same way she had done when she was just a fan. Dorina leaves Lavinia to continue singing on stage as she reunites with Nico.

Cast

Production
The film was the pet project of Mina Aragon, wife of Viva Films founder Vic del Rosario, Jr..

Casting
The role of Lavinia was offered to then up-and-coming singer Zsa Zsa Padilla as her film acting debut. She declined due to her friendship with Sharon Cuneta. Padilla would later star in the 2006 television adaptation as Dorina's mother, a character that does not exist in the film.

Filming
During filming, Sharon Cuneta, newly married to Gabby Concepcion, was pregnant with her first child, KC Concepcion. The production crew took efforts to conceal her pregnancy, including using props and body doubles, as well as utilizing half-body shots.

Halfway through shooting, director Emmanuel Borlaza suffered a heart attack and was told to rest. Leroy Salvador, who directed Cuneta in Sa Hirap at Ginahaw, also for Viva Films, was assigned to direct the unfinished sequences. He asked not to be credited for his work. The same year, Salvador directed Cuneta and Gil in another musical for Viva Films, Sana'y Wala Nang Wakas, released on July 30.

The final scene, a concert showdown between Lavinia and Dorina, was filmed at the Metropolitan Theater.

Music
The theme song "Bituing Walang Ningning" was performed by Sharon Cuneta, with melody and lyrics written by Willy Cruz.

Release
The film was released in theaters on Valentine's Day in 1985.

At the 2019 QCinema International Film Festival, Bituing Walang Ningning was screened as part of a Viva Classics presentation in recognition of the Vic del Rosario, Jr.'s contributions to the Filipino film industry. A Special Life Achievement Award was presented to Del Rosario at the festival.

Legacy
The line, "You are nothing but a second-rate, trying hard copycat!" spoken by Cherie Gil's character Lavinia Arguelles to Sharon Cuneta's Dorina Pineda, is considered iconic by Filipino culture critics. It was used in both the television and stage adaptations, and has remained closely associated with Gil. The film and the line established Gil as the Filipino film industry's "La Primera Contravida".

Adaptations
In 2006, the story was adapted as a daytime television drama of the same name by ABS-CBN starring Sarah Geronimo, Ryan Agoncillo, and Angelika de la Cruz. During its run, it was the highest-rated television drama of ABS-CBN. The final scene of the television drama was filmed as a special concert showdown in front of a live audience at Araneta Coliseum.

In 2015, an award-winning stage adaptation entitled "Bituing Walang Ningning: The Musical", written and directed by Freddie Santos, premiered at the Newport Performing Arts Theater at Resorts World Manila. The original cast starred Cris Villonco, Mark Bautista, and Monica Cuenco. The production featured 11 songs by Willy Cruz, including the film's original song "Bituing Walang Ningning". It received seven awards, including the award for Best Musical Production, at the 28th Aliw Awards.

References

External links
Bituing Walang Ningning at IMDb

1985 films
1980s musical drama films
1985 drama films
Philippine drama films
Filipino-language films
Viva Films films